The Bushwackers Drum and Bugle Corps is an all-age drum and bugle corps that competes in the Drum Corps Associates circuit, It was founded in 1981 in Harrison, New Jersey. The corps is based in Princeton, New Jersey and is a 501(c)(3) not-for-profit organization. The corps' percussion section is the only one in either junior or senior corps to ever win six straight High Percussion Awards at Championships: 1986, 1987, 1988, 1989, 1990, 1991. The Corps has won the Drum Corps Associates Open Class World Champions six times.

History 
The Bushwackers Drum and Bugle corps was formed as a parade corps in 1981 with a field corps forming in 1982. They were once located in Harrison, New Jersey. During their first year of competition, The Bushwackers were able to make DCA finals in 8th place.  In 1983, the corps was very competitive and ended the season with a fifth place showing.  The corps continued to grow until 1986, with a brand new staff, The Bushwackers captured their first DCA title.  This placed The Bushwackers in the upper echelon of DCA corps.  The Bushwackers would go on to win the DCA twice more before the end of the decade.  In the 1990s, The Bushwackers continued their championship ways, going on to take DCA’s top spot again in 1990, 1992, and 1993. The corps has been a top ten Finalist of DCA in 35 of its 38 years. In 2013 the Corps made its television debut on The Daily Show. In 2014 the Bushwackers performed as the opening act at the Special Olympics USA closing ceremony. In 2017, the Corps collaborated with ASPIRA of Pennsylvania to establish the Bushwackers Academy, an educational organization.

Show Summary 
Source: 

Gold background indicates DCA Championship; pale blue background indicates DCA Class Finalist

Traditions 
Corps Song 

The Bushwackers corps song is "The Perfect Year" from Sunset Boulevard by Andrew Lloyd Webber.

References

External links 
 Official Site
 History of the corps
 Bushwackers historical scores
 1986 Championship article
 Drum Corps Associates

Drum Corps Associates corps
Mercer County, New Jersey
1981 establishments in New Jersey
Musical groups established in 1981
Harrison, New Jersey